The Kill Room is an upcoming comedy thriller film starring Uma Thurman, Samuel L. Jackson, Joe Manganiello and Maya Hawke. It is written by Jonathan Jacobson and directed by Nicol Paone with Yale Entertainment financing.

Synopsis
The art world meets the underworld when a money-laundering scheme accidentally turns a hitman into an overnight avant-garde sensation.

Cast
 Uma Thurman as Patrice
 Samuel L. Jackson as Gordon 
 Joe Manganiello as Reggie
 Maya Hawke as Grace
 Larry Pine as Dr. Galvinson
 Dree Hemingway as Anika
 Debi Mazar as The Kimono
 Liv Morgan 
 Mike Doyle as Rafael Pronto 
 Marianne Rendón as Nicole
 Matthew Maher as Nate
 Jennifer Kim as Mae
 Noam Shapiro as Denys

Production
In April 2022 the project was announced with Uma Thurman and Samuel L. Jackson on-board the project with a Jonathan Jacobson penned screenplay and Nicol Paone set to direct. Production from Jordan Yale Levine, Jordan Beckerman and Jon Keeyes for Yale Productions along with Anne Clements of Idiot Savant Pictures, and Paone, Thurman, and Dannielle Thomas and Jason Weinberg from Untitled Entertainment.

Casting
In April 2022, it was announced that Joe Manganiello would be joining Thurman and Jackson in the cast. In May 2022, Dree Hemingway was revealed to have joined the cast. That same month reality television star Leah McSweeney was revealed to be making her feature film debut in the project, and shortly afterwards Maya Hawke was announced as working with her mother, Thurman, on a project for the first time. In June 2022, WWE Superstar Liv Morgan was announced to have joined the cast.

Filming
Principal photography started in New York and New Jersey in the spring of 2022. Filming was reported in Hoboken where the Field Colony cowork space was doubling as an art gallery, and Jersey City. Principal photography was scheduled to finish in June 2022 but reported problems with weather caused a delay and a re-location to Lavallette, New Jersey in October 2022.

References

External links

Films shot in New Jersey
American thriller films
2020s thriller films
2020s American films